is a waterfall located in the town of Daigo, Ibaraki Prefecture Japan. It is a nationally designated Place of Scenic Beauty. and is one of "Japan’s Top 100 Waterfalls", per a listing published by the Japanese Ministry of the Environment in 1990.

Overview
The falls are located within the borders of the Okukuji Prefectural Nature Park. The river ultimately joins the Kuji River, one of the major rivers in the northern Kantō region. Geologically, the falls are located on a cliff created by a volcanic ejecta some 15 million years ago. During winter the falls may freeze.

The closest train station is Fukuroda Station on the JR East Suigun Line located 3 kilometers away. By car, the falls can be reached from the Naka Interchange on the Jōban Expressway to Japan National Route 118 in the direction of Ōmiya.

Gallery

See also
 Japan's Top 100 Waterfalls
List of Places of Scenic Beauty of Japan (Ibaraki)

References

External links

Oomoide Romankan
Ibaraki Guide
ANA Japan Travel Planner

Places of Scenic Beauty
Waterfalls of Japan
Landforms of Ibaraki Prefecture
Tourist attractions in Ibaraki Prefecture
Daigo, Ibaraki